The Government of Punjab, also known as the State Government of Punjab or locally as the State Government, is the supreme governing authority of the Indian state of Punjab and its 23 districts. It consists of an executive, led by the Governor of Punjab, a judiciary and a legislative branch.

Like other states in India, the head of state of Punjab is the Governor, appointed by the President of India on the advice of the Central government. His or her post is largely ceremonial. The Chief Minister is the head of government and is vested with most of the executive powers. Chandigarh is the capital of Punjab, and houses the Vidhan Sabha (Legislative Assembly) and the secretariat. Chandigarh also serves as the capital of Haryana, and is a union territory of India. The Punjab & Haryana High Court, located in Chandigarh, has jurisdiction over the whole state.

The present Legislative Assembly of Punjab is unicameral, consisting of 117 Member of the Legislative Assembly (M.L.A). Its term is 5 years, unless sooner dissolved.

Cabinet Ministers

Legislative branch

Judiciary

Departments and agencies
 Departments of Government of Punjab, India
 Punjab Police

See also
 Emblem of Punjab
 List of ministers in the Government of Punjab, India
Punjab Remote Sensing Centre
Punjab State Human Rights Commission

References

External links
 Government of Punjab, website